San José Central Market is the largest market of the city of San José, Costa Rica. Established in 1880, it occupies an entire block on Avenida Central, 250m northwest of the Parque Central.

The market contains a complex of narrow alleys with over 200 shops, stalls, and cheap restaurants called sodas. A huge range of meats, fish, fruits, vegetables, coffees, and other products are for sale including snakeskin boots and cowboy saddles, herbal remedies, flowers, cooked meals, souvenirs, and local handcrafts. Tens of thousands of people visit the market daily.

Two blocks to the north is the Mercado Borbón, which specialises in food, with numerous butchers, fishmongers, and fruit vendors located there.

Gallery

References

1880 establishments in Costa Rica
Buildings and structures in San José, Costa Rica
Retail markets in Costa Rica
Tourist attractions in San José, Costa Rica